Janice Riggle Huie (born 15 December 1946) is a bishop of the United Methodist Church, elected in 1996 by the South Central Jurisdictional Conference. She has served in the church's Arkansas Annual (regional) Conference, 1996–2004, and in the Texas Annual Conference from 2004 until the end of her time as a Bishop.

Life and career
She is married to Robert Huie.  They have two sons: David (deceased) and Matthew. Bishop Huie served as the President of the United Methodist Council of Bishops until 2008, ostensibly the senior executive position of the United Methodist General Connection. She was succeeded by Bishop Greg Palmer of the Iowa Conference.

Huie was appointed to the Texas Annual Conference in 2004. The area is composed of 713 congregations and 290,855 members, spread throughout the eastern part of the US state of Texas. It includes Houston, Galveston, Beaumont, Texarkana, Longview, Tyler and College Station.

Education
Huie completed undergraduate study at University of Texas (1969). She went on to earn a Th.M. at Perkins School of Theology and holds a D.Min. from Candler School of Theology in 1989.

Ordained ministry
Bishop, Houston Area, 2004–2016
Bishop, Arkansas Area, 1996–2004
District Superintendent, San Angelo District, 1993–1996
Pastor, Manchaca United Methodist Church
Pastor, Mason First United Methodist Church, Mason, Texas
Pastor, St. Mark United Methodist Church, Austin, Texas
Associate Pastor, University United Methodist Church, Austin, TX
Marbridge Ranch
Campus Minister, University of Texas, Austin, TX

References

The Council of Bishops of the United Methodist Church 
InfoServ, the official information service of The United Methodist Church.

See also
 List of bishops of the United Methodist Church

1946 births
Living people
Women Methodist bishops
Candler School of Theology alumni
United Methodist bishops of the South Central Jurisdiction
20th-century Methodist bishops
21st-century Methodist bishops
University of Texas alumni